Boneh-ye Mohammad (also Romanized as Boneh-ye Moḩammad; also known as Bunneh-i-Muhammad) is a village in Shabankareh Rural District, Shabankareh District, Dashtestan County, Bushehr Province, Iran. At the 2006 census, its population was 46, in 15 families.

References 

Populated places in Dashtestan County